Phoebe Beasley (born June 3, 1943) is an American artist. Beasley is the only artist whose art has been awarded the Presidential Seal under two different U.S. Presidents - George H. W. Bush, and Bill Clinton. Beasley was the first African-American woman to become president of the Los Angeles County Arts Commission. She was the official artist of the 1987 and 2000 Los Angeles Marathons.

Early life and education 
Phoebe Beasley was born in Cleveland, Ohio. She has two siblings. Her mother died of a heart attack at the age of 29 (when Phoebe was 7 years old).

Beasley has a Bachelor of Fine Arts in art education from Ohio University, and a master's degree from Kent State University. She received an Honorary Doctorate of Fine Arts from Ohio University in 2005. She also delivered the commencement address that year.

Career 
Beasley's high school guidance counselor told her that she shouldn't major in art because there was 'no such thing as an African-American artist.' 

Beasley was told multiple times by white gallery owners, "I don't carry black art." She was also asked "why do you always paint black subjects?" Beasley's said, "It was strange - especially since they were painting nothing but white subjects... Most of my themes are what I know, based on my point of reference, just like any other artist."

From 1997 - 2012, she spent 15 years as a Commissioner on the Los Angeles County Arts Commission.

In 2012, she was one of 44 artists commissioned to make a collage on a life-size bust of President Barack Obama.

In 2013, she was given the Lifetime Achievement Award for Visual Arts & Advocacy by the California African American Museum.

In 2015, her most expensive work to date was sold for $11,875 at Swann Auction Galleries. That year, she was also appointed to the California Arts Council in 2015 by former California Governor Jerry Brown.

Many celebrities have purchased Beasley's work - including Oprah Winfrey, Tyler Perry, Shonda Rhimes, Tavis Smiley, and more.

Art inspiration 
Beasley says she likes to make beautiful things out of "other people's trash," and that her creativity comes out as she works with texture, since she considers collage her main medium of art. She explains one of her collages of flowers as representing "humanity - they represented living and dying... It does not matter how much you nurture something, we are all going to die."

Personal life 
Beasley was good friends with her mentor Maya Angelou, who's quoted as saying "Phoebe Beasley's eye has never failed her, has never lied to her, and her art generously gives us beauty, information, and always the truth."

Beasley said if she had it her way, she'd wear a ball gown every day.

Notes

External links 

 
 "The New Guard" (an interview with Phoebe Beasley)

Living people
1943 births
Artists from Cleveland
Ohio University alumni
Kent State University alumni
African-American women artists
American collage artists
Women collage artists
20th-century American women artists
20th-century American artists
21st-century American artists
21st-century American women artists
Artists from California
20th-century African-American women
20th-century African-American people
20th-century African-American artists
21st-century African-American women
21st-century African-American artists